Mararit may refer to:
the Mararit people
the Mararit language